The first election for the then named Tibetan Assembly was held on September 2, 1960, as part of a process of democratization of the Tibetan community encourage by the Dalai Lama.  The election for Parliament was announced by the Dalai Lama in a trip to Bodh Gaya on January of the same year. This was the first time in history that Tibetans could elect their political leaders and September 2 is currently celebrate among the Tibetan diaspora as “Democracy Day”. One of the first decisions of the Assembly was to abolish all hereditary titles and functions of the old aristocracy, Buddhist hierarchy and tribal leaders declaring the equality of all Tibetans. Since that, other 15 assemblies have been elected.

Composition

References

Central Tibetan Administration elections
Tibet